Knoema Corporation is a privately owned New Yorkbased data technology company that launched in 2014, and founded in 2011. The firm deploys knowledge management solutions. The company employs data engineers, economists, and developers based in New York City and Washington, DC.

Knoema offers access to data visualization resources for more than 3.9 billion time series from more than 1,500 sources that are commonly used in open press and other publications globally and referenced in data aggregator and science libraries.

History 
Knoema launched in 2014 under a collaboration with the African Development Bank to develop the African Information Highway, a multi-year open data and data transparency initiative. The company also worked with the European Commission Joint Research Centre and the African Development Bank to develop digital data collection and distribution of food commodities price data in Africa. Knoema also provided SDMX (Statistical Data and Metadata eXchange) compliant systems to facilitate structured data collection and sharing between national governments and the International Monetary Fund.

In 2019, the company deployed its patented autonomous search engine to surface data in users’ workflows in Microsoft Office and G-Suite applications by making weak associations among concepts via a knowledge graph trained using AI.

Knoema was selected as one of the 10 companies to participate in the 2020 Fintech Innovation Lab.

In February 2020, the firm pushed into the alternative data space through its acquisition of Adaptive Management, an alternative data aggregator and solutions provider.

In 2020, Knoema continued to develop partnerships with many data vendors. On 3 November 2020, Knoema launched its new data catalog, Alternative Data+. This catalog is made up of hundreds of alternative data tear sheets that feature information about each data provider including tickers and sectors covered, known biases, and in some cases, pricing, metadata, and sample datasets.

In December 2020, Knoema was acquired by Eldridge and received investment from Snowflake Ventures, and joined the Snowflake Data Marketplace.

Projects 
Knoema knowledge management solutions have been deployed to Fortune 500 companies, multilateral institutions, asset managers, non-profits, and governments worldwide.

References

External links 
 VentureBeat - How to turn big data into engaging infographics with a single app
  Guardian DataBlog - Trawling the web for socioeconomic data? Look no further than Knoema

Companies established in 2011
Online databases